Miguel Ángel "Míchel" Salgado Fernández (born 22 October 1975) is a Spanish former footballer who played as a right-back.

Nicknamed Il Due ("two" in Italian), he was known for his combative tackling and attacking play. After excellent displays at Celta, he spent an entire decade at Real Madrid, where former teammate Steve McManaman attested to his aggressive style by describing him as "the hardest person in the world....a genuine psychopath, even in training." He also played three seasons in England with Blackburn Rovers.

Salgado, who played 341 La Liga matches and scored seven goals, represented the Spain national team over eight years, collecting more than 50 caps and appearing in one World Cup and one European Championship.

Club career

Celta
Born in As Neves, Province of Pontevedra, Galicia, Salgado began his professional career with hometown's RC Celta de Vigo, making his La Liga debut on 22 January 1995 in a 0–4 away loss against Real Madrid. He was loaned for a season to UD Salamanca in the Segunda División, and after his return became the first-choice in his position.

Whilst at Celta, Salgado was involved in an incident with Atlético Madrid's Juninho Paulista in February 1998: after a dangerous challenge, the Brazilian was sidelined for six months and missed that year's FIFA World Cup.

Salgado scored a career-best three goals in the 1998–99 campaign, helping his team to finish fifth and qualify for the UEFA Cup.

Real Madrid
In 1999, Salgado was purchased by Real Madrid for €11,000,000, playing 29 league games in his first season while also helping the club win the UEFA Champions League. He was the capital side's starter during his first seven years, but was relegated to the bench by former Sevilla FC youngster Sergio Ramos in 2006–07.

Salgado was still able to contribute 16 matches to the Merengues 30th national title, mainly due to injuries to Pepe, with Ramos being relocated to centre back. In the following two campaigns he featured very rarely (only 17 appearances), being sent off in the final game of 2008–09, a 1–2 loss at CA Osasuna on 31 May 2009 as Madrid slumped to a fifth consecutive league defeat.

Salgado was released in early August 2009, with the team already midway into pre-season.

Blackburn Rovers
Aged nearly 34, Salgado moved to Blackburn Rovers of the Premier League on 19 August 2009, signing a two-year deal after impressing manager Sam Allardyce whilst on trial. He went on to say he was happy to be playing for his new club, intending to retire at Ewood Park.

Salgado made his competitive debut on 12 September 2009, against Wolverhampton Wanderers as a late substitute (3–1 home win). On 27 October he scored his first goal for his new team, in a 5–2 victory over Peterborough United in the Football League Cup.

On 27 January 2011, 35-year-old Salgado agreed to a contract extension. He was first choice in the first games of the 2011–12 season, until picking up an injury.

Blackburn manager Steve Kean revealed in December 2011 that Salgado was being omitted from the squad as his contract stated that the player was entitled to a new deal if he played nine more matches in the campaign, the club not being able to afford fresh terms.

Futsal and later years

Aged 40, Salgado came out of retirement to join Kochi 5s in India's Premier Futsal as a marquee player. He later was part of the board of Heritage Sports Holdings, which owned the football clubs Gibraltar United F.C. and UD Los Barrios.

Salgado came out of retirement again in April 2018, starting for Independiente F.C. in a 1–1 draw against C.D. Plaza Amador in the quarter-finals of the Panamanian Clausura tournament. On 5 February 2021, he was appointed director of football of Cypriot First Division side Pafos FC.

International career
Salgado won the first of his 53 caps for Spain on 5 September 1998, in an infamous 3–2 loss in Cyprus for the UEFA Euro 2000 qualifiers. He was part of the nation's squads at Euro 2000 and the 2006 FIFA World Cup, starting in the former tournament and being backup in the latter to Real Madrid teammate Ramos.

Due to last-minute injuries, Salgado missed out on the 2002 World Cup and Euro 2004. He also represented the Galician autonomous team, which he later coached alongside Deportivo de La Coruña's Fran.

On 4 September 2018, Salgado was named assistant manager to the Egyptian national team.

Personal life
Salgado is married to Malula Sanz, daughter of former Real Madrid president Lorenzo Sanz. He is an avid chess fan.

Career statistics
Club

International

HonoursReal MadridLa Liga: 2000–01, 2002–03, 2006–07, 2007–08
Supercopa de España: 2001, 2003, 2008
UEFA Champions League: 1999–2000, 2001–02
Intercontinental Cup: 2002
UEFA Super Cup: 2002Spain U21'
UEFA European Under-21 Championship: 1998

References

External links

1975 births
Living people
People from O Condado
Sportspeople from the Province of Pontevedra
Spanish footballers
Footballers from Galicia (Spain)
Association football defenders
La Liga players
Segunda División players
Tercera División players
Celta de Vigo B players
RC Celta de Vigo players
UD Salamanca players
Real Madrid CF players
Premier League players
Blackburn Rovers F.C. players
C.A. Independiente de La Chorrera players
UEFA Champions League winning players
Spain youth international footballers
Spain under-21 international footballers
Spain international footballers
UEFA Euro 2000 players
2006 FIFA World Cup players
Spanish expatriate footballers
Expatriate footballers in England
Expatriate footballers in Panama
Spanish expatriate sportspeople in England
Spanish expatriate sportspeople in Panama
Spanish expatriate sportspeople in India
Spanish expatriate sportspeople in Cyprus
Spanish football managers
Sanz family